List of Montenegrin sportspeople

Athletics
Danijel Furtula
Slađana Perunović

Basketball
Predrag Drobnjak
Jelena Dubljević
Duško Ivanović
Iva Perovanović
Vlado Šćepanović
Predrag Savović

Football (soccer) players
Branko Brnović
Dragoljub Brnović
Andrija Delibašić
Dragoje Leković
Predrag "Peđa" Mijatović
Ljubomir Radanović
Srđan Radonjić
Dejan Savićević
Mirko Vučinić
Simon Vukčević
Refik Šabanadžović
Anto Drobnjak
Bojan Brnović
Igor Gluščević
Vukašin Poleksić
Igor Burzanović
Dragan Bogavac
Dejan Ognjanović
Branko Bošković Serbia born Montenegro internationals
Vlado Jeknić
Milan Jovanović Serbia born Montenegro internationals
Stevan Jovetić
Vladimir Božović
Jovan Tanasijević Serbia born Montenegro internationals
Savo Pavićević
Duško Đurišić
Marko Baša Serbia born Montenegro internationals

Handball
Maja Savić
Petar Kapisoda
Ljiljana Mugoša
Svetlana Mugoša 
Radivoj Krivokapić

Judo
Dragomir Bečanović
Srđan Mrvaljević

Tennis
Danka Kovinić

Volleyball
Miodrag Gvozdenović
Igor Vušurović

Waterpolo
Vladimir Gojković
Aleksandar Ivović
Mlađan Janović
Nikola Janović
Predrag Jokić
Veljko Uskoković
Nenad Vukanić
Boris Zloković

Montenegro

Sportspeople